Miller Mountain is located in the Candelaria Hills of Mineral County, Nevada.  "Borax" Smith's board-and-batten cabin where he lived when he discovered a rich borax deposit at nearby Teel's Marsh was located here.

References 

Mountains of Nevada
Mountains of the Great Basin
Landforms of Mineral County, Nevada